Paweł Bieliński was a Polish politician who served as the mayor of Warsaw between 17 April 1807 and 4 July 1807 in the Napoleonic Poland.

References

Year of birth missing
Year of death missing
Mayors of Warsaw